Tankie is a pejorative reference to hard-line, pro-Soviet members of the Communist Party of Great Britain.

Tankie or Tankies may also refer to:

The Tankies, the nickname of the  Royal Tank Regiment
Tankies, the third series of Battlefields (comics)
Tank driver, a driver of a tank
A truck driver slang for tanker drivers, who  haul liquids or bulk materials in tanks
Fans of the World of Tanks game
Fans of the Thomas the Tank Engine & Friends TV series and media franchise.